The Roman Catholic Diocese of Yagoua is a diocese located in the city of Yagoua in the Ecclesiastical province of Garoua in Cameroon.

History
March 11, 1968: Established as Apostolic Prefecture of Yagoua from the Diocese of Garoua
January 29, 1973: Promoted as Diocese of Yagoua

Leadership, in reverse chronological order
Bishops of Yagoua (Roman rite), below
Bishop Barthélemy Yaouda (since 2008)
Bishop Emmanuel Bushu (1992–2006), appointed Bishop of Buéa
Bishop Antoine Ntalou (1982–1992), appointed Archbishop of Garoua
Bishop Christian Wiyghan Tumi (1979–1982), appointed Coadjutor Archbishop of Garoua; future Cardinal 
Bishop Louis Charpenet, O.M.I. (1973–1977); see below 
Prefect Apostolic of Yagoua (Roman rite), below
Father Louis Charpenet, O.M.I. (1968–1973); see above

See also
Roman Catholicism in Cameroon

References

External links
GCatholic.org

Yagoua
Christian organizations established in 1968
Roman Catholic dioceses and prelatures established in the 20th century
Roman Catholic Ecclesiastical Province of Garoua
Roman Catholic bishops of Yagoua